The Northrop Grumman MQ-8C Fire Scout (known as the Fire-X during development) is an unmanned helicopter developed by Northrop Grumman for use by the United States Navy. The MQ-8C also has autonomous take-off and landing capability. It is designed to provide reconnaissance, situational awareness, aerial fire support and precision targeting support for ground, air and sea forces. The MQ-8C airframe is based on the Bell 407, while the avionics and other systems are developed from those used on the MQ-8B Fire Scout. It first flew in October 2013 and achieved initial operational capability on 28 June 2019.

Design and development

On 3 May 2010, Northrop Grumman announced plans to fly a Bell 407 helicopter modified with autonomous controls from the MQ-8B. Named Fire-X, it was to demonstrate an unmanned cargo resupply capability to the US Navy. The unmanned Fire-X completed its first flight at Yuma Proving Ground in Arizona on 20 December 2010. On 23 April 2012, Northrop Grumman received a $262.3 million contract from the Navy to build the newly designated MQ-8C Fire Scout; the work included two developmental aircraft and six low-rate production aircraft initially. The Navy wants 28 MQ-8Cs for naval special operations forces. In March 2013, the Navy incorporated the Rolls-Royce 250-C47E engine into the MQ-8C for a 5 percent increase in hot and high power, 2 percent reduced fuel consumption, 8 percent increase in rated takeoff power, and better reliability.

In early July 2013, Northrop Grumman delivered the first MQ-8C to the Navy. Ground testing was done to ensure that the systems worked properly and communicated with the ground control station prior to conducting the first flight. The MQ-8C shares software, avionics, payloads, and ship ancillary equipment with the MQ-8B. The MQ-8C was expected to fly in early October 2013, and be deployed in late 2014. The APKWS II was to be added to the C-model sometime after 2016, but ship integration issues and limited magazine space put the effort on hold, and it was eventually discarded. On 24 September 2013, the MQ-8C Fire-X delivered to the Navy turned on its engines for 10 minutes in preparation for first flight. A second MQ-8C was to be delivered on 30 September. First flight was scheduled for early to mid-October, although the exact date was not determined, as such tests are often delayed by minor system problems. The MQ-8C flight test regime is to last six months.

The MQ-8C Fire Scout first flew on 31 October 2013. It flew for 7 minutes in restricted airspace using autonomous controls at Naval Base Ventura County. It flew a second time hours later that day to an altitude of 500 ft. The MQ-8C was jointly operated by Northrop Grumman and the Navy. Northrop Grumman delivered the second MQ-8C on 25 November 2013. They are under contract to build 14 helicopters. The second MQ-8C flew on 12 February 2014.  The aircraft had flown 66 hours by February 2014. On 10 March 2014, the MQ-8C reached 100 flight hours. 19 C-model Fire Scouts are on order with two in flight testing; the first deployment on an LCS is scheduled for 2015. The MQ-8C began testing aboard the destroyer   on 16 December 2014, executing 22 landings and recoveries in less than four hours. Testing was completed on 19 December, executing 32 takeoffs and recoveries over three flights. The MQ-8C will be ready to perform surface warfare missions in 2018 and mine countermeasure missions in 2020.  The aircraft's first deployment is expected for 2016 to give Littoral Combat Ships a -radius ISR capability.  

Northrop Grumman flew the MQ-8C demonstrator installed with their AN/ZPY-1 STARLite Radar, although there was no requirement for an MQ-8C radar at the time; the Navy began seeking information for a radar for the MQ-8C in July 2014 with surface search, synthetic aperture radar, inverse SAR, and weather mode capabilities. Although the AN/ZPY-4 has been installed on some B-model Fire Scouts, the larger C-model can accommodate a larger and more powerful radar. The Fire Scout program office investigated whether to equip the airframe itself to perform more missions or focus on manned-unmanned teaming with larger MH-60S/R Seahawk helicopters. On 26 May 2016, NAVAIR signed a contract for the Osprey 30 lightweight AESA radar for the MQ-8C, the first system of its type to offer full spherical coverage with no moving parts; the 360-degree,  airborne radar uses fixed panels distributed around the body of aircraft, mounting antennas weighing just over  each. The radar is classified as the AN/ZPY-8 and will be retrofitted onto the Navy's MQ-8C's.

The first operational MQ-8C was delivered to the US Navy in December 2014. Its final developmental flight was completed on 29 April 2015, after 450 hours completed in 327 flights. In August 2015, Northrop Grumman demonstrated the MQ-8C's endurance with an 11-hour flight. On 20 November 2015, the MQ-8C completed a 3-week operational assessment period to assess system performance, endurance, and reliability of the unmanned helicopter over 83.4 hours in 11 flights.  To date, the aircraft logged 730 flight hours over 427 flights.  Ship-based testing is expected to begin in 2017. In July 2018, Air Test and Evaluation Squadron 1 concluded the initial operational test and evaluation of the MQ-8C, conducted aboard the USS Coronado.

The MQ-8C was declared mission capable on 28 June 2019. In tandem with a change in focus for the LCS involving increasing the ship's lethality, the MQ-8C's role was changed to focus on providing targeting and surveillance data. While the helicopter could carry 7-tube APKWS guided rocket pods, the LCS only has one weapons magazine used to store all the ship's weapons and didn't provide much space for loading weapons onto the aircraft. Instead of being a weapons platform, the MQ-8C will use its long endurance and radar to provide the LCS with enhanced over-the-horizon targeting capabilities.

By January 2023, the U.S. Navy had procured 38 MQ-8Cs. 10 are used for operations while the rest are kept in storage. All are kept on the West Coast operated by Helicopter Sea Combat Squadrons 21 and 23 to support the MCM package of Independence-class LCS.

Operators

United States Navy

Specifications

See also

References

External links

 MQ-8C Fire Scout page on northropgrumman.com
 MQ-8C Fire-X page on northropgrumman.com
 US Navy MQ-8 Fire Scout page

Unmanned helicopters
Unmanned aerial vehicles of the United States
2010s United States military reconnaissance aircraft
Airborne military robots
MQ-008C Fire Scout
2010s United States helicopters
Northrop Grumman MQ-8C Fire Scout
Aircraft first flown in 2013